461 Ocean Boulevard is the second studio album by English musician Eric Clapton. The album was released in late July 1974 for RSO Records, shortly after the record company released the hit single "I Shot the Sheriff" in early July the same year. The album topped various international charts and sold more than two million copies.

The album was Clapton's return to the recording studio after a three-year hiatus due to his heroin addiction. The title refers to the address on Ocean Boulevard in Golden Beach, Florida, where Clapton lived while recording the album. Upon completing the album, Clapton and RSO head Robert Stigwood recommended the house and Miami's Criteria Studios to fellow RSO artists, the Bee Gees, who then moved in to write and record Main Course. The street address of the house was changed after the album's release due to fans flocking to the property. The house has since been rebuilt and the street address restored.

A remastered two-disc deluxe edition of the album was released in 2004, which included selections from two live shows at the Hammersmith Odeon, and additional studio jam sessions.

Production
After overcoming his heroin addiction, Clapton realized that he had wasted three years of his life, stating he had not done anything other than watch television and get out of shape. When Clapton sought help working on a farm, he began to listen to a lot of new music and old blues records he had brought with him and started to play again, even writing whole songs out of simple ideas. With these song ideas in mind, Clapton was given a demo tape by Carl Radle, the former bassist for Derek and the Dominos, with songs performed by Radle with keyboardist Dick Sims and drummer Jamie Oldaker. Clapton liked the recordings, calling them "simply superb".

Clapton was given time to write new material for a next album by Radle. When Clapton set to work on tracks for the upcoming studio release, he wanted to leave his songs as incomplete as possible, so that the musicians, who were going to record with Clapton in the studio, would get the chance to make them their own. After Clapton appeared in the rock opera Tommy, his manager at the time, Robert Stigwood, contacted him about a new project. Stigwood arranged for Clapton to record at the Criteria Studios in Miami, Florida, with Radle, Sims, Oldaker and record producer Tom Dowd. When the time came to record the new album, Clapton was worried about both its commercial and artistic success, noting his concept of a new album would work only when there was chemistry between the musicians. Clapton also hired guest vocalist Yvonne Elliman and guitarist George Terry as full-time members of his group.

Stigwood also paid for Clapton to live at a rental house at 461 Ocean Boulevard in the town of Golden Beach near Miami. The whole album was recorded from April to May 1974. For the recording sessions, Clapton used his Blackie Fender Stratocaster electric guitar. For slide guitar work, Clapton used several Gibson ES-335 guitars. He also played vintage Martin acoustic guitars.

Music and lyrics
Ryan Book of Music Times felt the music on the album ranges from "bright blues rock" to sentimental ballads like "Let It Grow",
and Robert Christgau said it features "sleepy postjunk funk" with intimations of sex.

In his 2007 autobiography My Life, Clapton recalls that he was very pleased with the song's lyrics and instrumental parts of "Let It Grow", which he had written himself, although music critics and also Clapton noted, that the melody and chord progression is nearly the same as Led Zeppelin's "Stairway to Heaven". Except for "Let It Grow" and "Get Ready", a song Clapton wrote with guest vocalist Yvonne Elliman about her, the album consists of various cover versions of titles that had been in Clapton's head for a long time: "Willie and the Hand Jive", "Steady Rollin' Man" and "I Can't Hold Out". Clapton had first heard the song "Give Me Strength" in London in the 1960s, when he had been living with Charlie and Diana Radcliffe on Fulham Road. He wanted to record the song, as he thought it would be a good fit for the album. While the band was recording, George Terry brought the album Burnin' from Bob Marley and the Wailers to Clapton's attention, stating he really liked the song "I Shot the Sheriff". He persuaded Clapton to record a version of this tune, which Clapton disliked, because of its "hardcore reggae" melody. Finally, the band convinced Clapton to put the song on the album, noting it would definitely become a hit single. When Clapton met Bob Marley years after his take on the tune was released, Marley told Clapton he really liked the cover.

The album finishes with George Terry's "Mainline Florida", which "breaks away from the established tone of the record" and features Clapton using a talk box during his outgoing solo.

Marketing and sales
461 Ocean Boulevard was released in July 1974 on vinyl and compact music cassette in the Americas, Europe, Asia, Australia and New Zealand. RSO Records decided to release the album in territories, where it might chart and sell a lot of copies; it was released in Argentina, Australia, Austria, Brazil, Canada, Denmark, France, Germany, Greece, India, Ireland, Italy, Japan, Mexico, in the Netherlands, New Zealand, Norway, Portugal, Russia, Spain, Sweden, Taiwan, in the United Kingdom, in the United States, Uruguay, Yugoslavia and Venezuela. Therefore, it was one of the few pop-music albums to be legally sold in the USSR. Over the years, the album was reissued several times including in 1988, 1996 and 2004 for reunited Europe, also in compact disc format and via digital music download.

461 Ocean Boulevard is one of Clapton's most successful commercial releases, reaching the Top 10 in eight countries, and peaking at number one in three territories including Canada and the United States. The album reached the Top 5 in the United Kingdom, peaking at number three. In the Netherlands and Norway, the 1974 studio release reached number four on the national album charts. In Germany and New Zealand, the album reached eleven and thirty-eight respectively. On the 1974 year-end charts, the studio album reached number five on the Canadian RPM chart and in the Netherlands, the album was ranked at number twenty-two. In the United States, the release was certified with a Gold disc for shipment figures of more than 500,000 copies.

Two singles were released; the first, "I Shot the Sheriff", was released by RSO Records in early July 1974, before the album was released. Clapton's take on the Marley tune outplayed the original version, reaching the Top 10 single charts in nine countries, becoming Clapton's only number one hit on the Billboard Hot 100 chart. In 2003, Clapton's version was inducted into the Grammy Hall of Fame. The single was also Clapton's first single to sell well internationally, achieving Gold certifications in the United States as well as a double Platinum award in Canada. The second track to be released as a single was "Willie and the Hand Jive", which came out in October 1974. Clapton slowed down the tempo for his version. Author Chris Welch believes that the song benefits from this "slow burn". However, Rolling Stone critic Ken Emerson complains that the song sounds "disconcertingly mournful". Other critics praised Clapton's confident vocals. Author Marc Roberty claimed that on this song, "Clapton's vocals had clearly matured, with fluctuations and intonations that were convincing rather than tentative as in the past". Clapton's version of the song was released as a single in 1974 and reached number 26 on the Billboard Hot 100 and position 28 in the Netherlands.

Critical reception and legacy

Reviewing for Creem in September 1974, Robert Christgau said: "As unlikely as it seems, Clapton has taken being laid-back into a new dimension. Perhaps the most brilliant exploration of the metaphorical capacities of country blues ever attempted, way better than Taj Mahal for all of side one. On side two, unfortunately, he goes a little soft. But I'll settle for two questionable live albums if he'll give us a solo record as good as this every three years." He later expanded on this praise in Christgau's Record Guide: Rock Albums of the Seventies (1981):

In 1974, journalist Ken Emerson at Rolling Stone called Clapton's guitar work unnotable and criticized Clapton for hiding behind his other musicians, whom Emerson deemed less than capable. Emerson also questioned Clapton's decision to play a dobro on the album, but called "Let It Grow" a highlight. Emerson considered Clapton's re-arrangement of "Motherless Children" to be too upbeat for a sombre song.

In a retrospective review for AllMusic, critic Stephen Thomas Erlewine calls the studio album a "tighter, more focused outing that enables Clapton to stretch out instrumentally" and adds that the "pop concessions on the album [as well as] the sleek production [and] the concise running times don't detract from the rootsy origins of the material". Finishing his review, Erlewine notes, the 461 Ocean Boulevard "set the template for Clapton's 1970s albums". The critic awarded the release four and a half out of five possible stars. For the Blender magazine review of the album's 2004 deluxe edition, Jon Pareles called the Eric Clapton of the Cream-era superior to the Clapton of the 461 Ocean Boulevard-era, because of what Pareles describes as strained singing on 461 Ocean Boulevard. Pareles also described Clapton's remake of "I Shot the Sheriff" as a copy with no original arrangement; he also praised the song "Let It Grow", but criticized it for sounding too much like "Stairway to Heaven".

In a retrospective review for Uncut, Nigel Williamson considered that with 461 Ocean Boulevard, Clapton "rediscovered the primacy of music in his life". Critic Ryan Book from The Music Times likes the track listing very much and thinks that "the climate comes out in Clapton's work, ten tracks ranging from bright blues rock to, well, 'Let It Grow'." Eduardo Rivadavia at Ultimate Classic Rock calls the release a "watershed solo LP" and notes the popularity of the album, stating it is a "wanted man". The journalist finished his review by calling 461 Ocean Boulevard the album in which Clapton's "incomparable talents and this inspired song set were finally captured".

Rolling Stone placed the album at No. 411 on its 2012 list of the 500 Greatest Albums of All Time, commenting that Clapton had "returned from heroin addiction with a disc of mellow, springy grooves minus guitar histrionics", which "paid tribute to Robert Johnson and Elmore James". The album was included Robert Dimery's book 1001 Albums You Must Hear Before You Die.

Track listings

Personnel 

 Eric Clapton – lead vocals, guitars, Dobro
 George Terry – guitars, backing vocals
 Albhy Galuten – piano (A1, A5, B3, B4, B5), electric piano (A4), ARP synthesizer (B3), clavichord (B4)
 Dick Sims – keyboards
 Carl Radle – bass 
 Jamie Oldaker – drums, percussion
 Al Jackson Jr. – drums (A2)
 Yvonne Elliman – backing vocals
 Tom Bernfield – backing vocals

Production 
 Tom Dowd – producer
 Bill Levenson – compilation producer on Deluxe Edition
 Ron Fawcus – engineer
 Andy Knight – engineer
 Karl Richardson – engineer
 Suha Gur – mastering
 Darcy Proper – mastering at Sterling Sound (New York, NY).
 Bob Defrin – art direction, design 
 David Gahr – photography
 Ryan Null – photo coordination

Charts

Weekly charts

Year-end charts

Certifications

References

External links 
 

Eric Clapton albums
RSO Records albums
1974 albums
Albums produced by Tom Dowd
Covers albums
Albums recorded at the Hammersmith Apollo